Kevin Northcutt (born March 23, 1973) is a retired American professional wrestler.

Career

World Championship Wrestling (2000)
After unsuccessful try-outs with Extreme Championship Wrestling and the World Wrestling Federation in the late 1990s, Northcutt worked for World Championship Wrestling in late 2000 as a jobber, working the likes of Norman Smiley, Mike Awesome and Chuck Palumbo, among others.

Total Nonstop Action Wrestling (2003-2004)
During his time in Total Nonstop Action Wrestling (TNA) as part of the Red Shirt Security, he won the NWA World Tag Team Championship with Joe E. Legend & held the belts from January 28, 2004 until February 4 of the same year. He was helping Jeff Jarrett and the Red Shirt Security, was the heel security team working for Don Callis, with the Black Shirt Security (Chris Vaughn and Rick Santel) were working for Erik Watts. They engaged in a feud which was never really solved because of the sudden departure of both securities. The Red Shirt Security lost the tag team belts in a match to Abyss and A.J. Styles, even though Abyss had turned on his own partner as he was also working for Don Callis and Jeff Jarrett. He was released from TNA.

Independent circuit
Northcutt next wrestled on the independent circuit, mostly in Louisiana with Mid South Wrestling Entertainment and Old Skool Wrestling Entertainment. He regained the NWA Texas Heavyweight title by defeating Spoiler 2000, with a pile drive finish in 12 minutes on May 2, 2009, at the Oil Palace in Tyler, Texas. It was his ninth reign since 1999. After 300 days, he vacated the title on February 26, 2010.

Championships and accomplishments
Canadian Wrestling Federation
CWF Heavyweight Championship (1 time)
CWF Match of the Year (2004)
Deep South Wrestling
DSW Louisiana Heavyweight Championship (1 time)
Mid-South Wrestling
MSW Heavyweight Championship (1 time)
Mid-South Wrestling Entertainment
MSWE Tag-Team Championship (1 time) - with Marty Graw
National Wrestling Alliance1
NWA National Heavyweight Championship (1 time)
NWA Battlezone
NWA Mississippi Heavyweight Championship (1 time)
NWA North American Tag Team Championship (1 time) - with John Saxon
NWA Southern Tag Team Championship (2 times) - with John Saxon
NWA Southwest
NWA National Heavyweight Championship (1 time)
NWA Texas Heavyweight Championship (9 times)
NWA World Tag Team Championship (1 time) - with Jimmy James
NWA Universal
NWA Texas Heavyweight Championship (1 time)
New South Wrestling Alliance
NSWA Heavyweight Championship (1 time)
Old Skool Wrestling Entertainment
OSWE Tag-Team Championship (1 time) - with Marty Graw
Total Nonstop Action Wrestling
NWA World Tag Team Championship (1 time) - with Joe Legend

1Title was awarded to him and records don't indicate where it was awarded or what promotion he wrestled for at the time.

References

External links
Kevin Northcutt at OWW.com
Kevin Northcutt at Bodyslamming.com

Kevin Northcutt at accelerator3359.com

1973 births
Living people
American male professional wrestlers
Professional wrestlers from Louisiana
People from Chalmette, Louisiana
20th-century professional wrestlers
21st-century professional wrestlers
NWA World Tag Team Champions
NWA National Heavyweight Champions